The 387th Air Expeditionary Group (387 AEG) is a provisional United States Air Force unit assigned to the 386th Air Expeditionary Wing at Ali Al Salem Air Base, Kuwait under United States Air Forces Central Command (USAFCENT).  As a provisional unit, it may be activated or inactivated at any time.  In 2016, the groups mission was to provide support for base operations, coordination with host nation partners, and administration of the Joint Expeditionary Tasked individual augmentees in the United States Central Command (USCENTCOM) area of responsibility.

During World War II, the group's predecessor unit, the 387th Bombardment Group (Medium) was a Martin B-26 Marauder bombardment group assigned to the Eighth and later Ninth Air Force in Western Europe.

Overview
Active in 2003 as an Fairchild Republic A-10 Thunderbolt II unit as part of Operation Iraqi Freedom, it was inactivated after the active conflict ended. It is now an active tenant organization of the 386th Air Expeditionary Wing, stationed at both Abdullah Al-Mubarak Air Base, Kuwait and Ali Al Salem Air Base, Kuwait associated with Air Mobility Command.

Units:

 43rd Expeditionary Electronic Combat Squadron (EC-130H)
 46th Expeditionary Reconnaissance Squadron (MQ-1, MQ-9)
 737th Expeditionary Airlift Squadron (C-130)

History

387th Bombardment Group

The 387th Bombardment Group (Medium) was constituted on 25 November 1942, and activated on 1 December 1942 at MacDill Field near Tampa, Florida The group had four operational squadrons, 556th (FW), 557th (KS), 558th (KX), and 559th (TQ) and was equipped with the Martin B-26B/C Marauder. After training at several stateside airfields, the group was deployed to England in June 1943.

In England, the 387th was assigned to the Eighth Air Force 3d Bomb Wing and stationed at RAF Chipping Ongar in Essex. The 387th was the fourth Marauder group to arrive in the UK. The Group began combat on 15 August 1943 by joining with three other B-26 groups attacking coastal defences on the French Coast near Boulogne, and was mounted in thick fog. While taking off, one of the B-26 Bombers crashed at the end of the main runway, killing all of the crew except the tail gunner. The group concentrated its attacks on airfields during the first months of operations. In common with other Marauder units of the 3d Bomb Wing, the 387th was transferred to Ninth Air Force on 16 October 1943.

The group made tactical strikes on V-weapon sites in France in the winter of 1943–1944. Hit airfields at Leeuwarden and Venlo during Big Week, 20–25 February 1944, the intensive campaign against the German Air Force and aircraft industry. Helped to prepare for the invasion of Normandy by attacking coastal batteries and bridges in France during May 1944. Bombed along the invasion coast on 6 June 1944 and supported ground forces throughout the month by raiding railroads, bridges, road junctions, defended areas, and fuel dumps.

The 387th Bomb Group moved to RAF Stoney Cross in Hampshire on 21 July 1944 when Ninth Air Force moved the 98th Bomb Wing's four Marauder groups into the New Forest area at the earliest opportunity to place them closer to the French Normandy Invasion beaches. On 27 June the 387th became operational from Stoney Cross, bombing along the invasion coast and supporting ground forces by raiding railways, bridges, road junctions, defended areas, and fuel dumps.

By 1 September the group was able to move across the English Channel to its Advanced Landing Ground at a former Luftwaffe airfield at Maupertus, France (A-15).

The group ended combat operations in April 1945. On 24 May the group was sent to Rosieres-en-Santerre Air Base, France for several months. The 387th Bomb Group returned to the US in November and was inactivated at Camp Kilmer, New Jersey on 17 November 1945.

387th Air Expeditionary Group
The 387th Air Expeditionary Group was activated by Air Combat Command as part of the Global War on Terror in 2003. The 387 AEG was a blend of attack and reconnaissance forces, consisting of close to 500 103 FW and 104 FW personnel and totaling around 1,300. A-10 Thunderbolt II aircraft were assigned to the 131st Expeditionary Fighter Squadron from the 131 FS, 104 FW (Massachusetts ANG), Barnes MAP (MA) (11 aircraft) and 118 FS, 103 FW (Connecticut ANG), Bradley ANGB (CT) (7 Aircraft).

Together, the deployed A-10 pilots logged 1,119 sorties and 3,821 flying hours (3,100 combat hours during 900 sorties) with no combat losses or battle damage. The missions included 35 CSAR sorties, with the rescue of an aircraft crew and numerous medical evacuations to the unit's credit.

All 18 aircraft arrived as formation over Bradley IAP on 29 April 2003. Diverting to the west of the air base, the formation split up. The 104 FW aircraft swung north, the 103rd FW aircraft went on to Hartford for a fly-by salute at the state Capitol before touching down one by one.

Lineage
 Constituted as 387th Bombardment Group (Medium) on 25 November 1942
 Activated on 1 December 1942.
 Inactivated on 17 November 1945
 Redesignated 387th Bombardment Group on 31 July 1985 (Remained inactive)
 Redesignated 387th Air Expeditionary Group and converted to provisional status 1 January 2003.

Assignments
 III Bomber Command, 1 December 1942 – 10 June 1943
 3d Bombardment Wing, 25 June 1943
 IX Bomber Command, 16 October 1943
 98th Combat Bombardment (later, 98th Bombardment) Wing, 5 December 1943 – November 1945
 Army Service Forces (for inactivation), 14–17 November 1945
 Air Combat Command to activate or inactivate any time after 1 January 2003
 Attached to: United States Air Forces Central Command, 2003–

Components
 556th Bombardment Squadron (FW): 1 December 1942 – 17 November 1945
 557th Bombardment Squadron (KS): 1 December 1942 – 17 November 1945
 558th Bombardment Squadron (KX): 1 December 1942 – 17 November 1945
 559th Bombardment Squadron (TQ): 1 December 1942 – 17 November 1945
 131st Expeditionary Fighter Squadron, 2003
 387th Expeditionary Logistics Readiness Squadron, 2003 – 6 March 2012
 387th Expeditionary Support Squadron
 387th Expeditionary Security Forces Squadron

Stations

 MacDill Field, Florida, 1 December 1942
 Drane Field, Florida, 12 April 1943
 Godman Field, Kentucky, c. 11 May – 10 June 1943
 RAF Chipping Ongar (AAF-162), England 25 June 1943
 RAF Stoney Cross (AAF-452), England 18 July 1944 452
 Maupertuis Airfield (A-15), France, 22 August 1944
 Chateaudun Airfield (A-39), France, 18 September 1944

 Clastres Airfield (A-71), France, 30 October 1944
 Maastricht Airfield (Y-44) Netherlands, 29 April 1945
 Rosieres-en-Santerre Airfield (B-87), France, 24 May-c. November 1945
 Camp Kilmer, New Jersey, 14–17 November 1945
 Prince Hassan Air Base (H5), Jordan, Mid January-1 May 2003
 Abdullah Al-Mubarak Air Base, Kuwait, 2003–present
 Ali Al Salem Air Base, Kuwait, 2003–present

See also

 List of Martin B-26 Marauder operators

References

Notes

Bibliography

 Freeman, Roger A. (1978) Airfields of the Eighth: Then and Now. After the Battle 
 Freeman, Roger A. (1991) The Mighty Eighth The Colour Record. Cassell & Co. 
 Freeman, Roger A. (1994) UK Airfields of the Ninth: Then and Now 1994. After the Battle 
 Freeman, Roger A. (1996) The Ninth Air Force in Colour: UK and the Continent-World War Two. After the Battle 
 
 
 
 A-10 Units of Operation Iraqi Freedom – Part II

External links

387